Where's George? is a British comedy film starring Sydney Howard. It was made in 1935.

Where's George? was modelled on the successful 1931 association football film Up for the Cup. Sports films were popular in this era and in 1935, the British & Dominions Film Corporation decided that they wanted to make a comedy centred on the sport of rugby league. Both films were directed by Jack Raymond, and also featured the same star, Sydney Howard, as Yorkshireman Alf Scodger.

The film went on general release in late 1935 but just a few weeks later, in January 1936, King George V died. The film was consequently renamed Hope of His Side as posters asking 'Where's George?' were not considered appropriate.

The film's script was written by Walter Greenwood and featured actors Mabel Constanduros, Leslie Sarony and Frank Pettingell. Herbert Wilcox was director of production. Carver Doone, a six-foot eight wrestler, played the huge full-back that Alf dodges to score the winning try.

Plot
The film is about Alf Scodger's attempts to fool his overbearing wife. As a result of these attempts, he accidentally discovers that he has a talent for rugby league and is picked to play for his local Yorcaster club against their rivals Oldcastle from Lancashire.

'George' is a foal that Alf buys and then loses. While playing in the rugby match, Alf spots George in the next field and whilst running to recapture the foal, catches the ball and scores the match-winning try.

A local dignitary watching the match sees him score the try and this leads to Alf and his wife becoming reconciled.

Cast
 Sydney Howard as Alf Scodger  
 Mabel Constanduros as Mrs. Scodger  
 Leslie Sarony as Willy Yates  
 Frank Pettingell as Harry Swan  
 Sam Livesey as Sir Richard Lancaster 
 Wally Patch as Ted Sloane

Shooting
In the summer of 1935, crowd scenes were filmed in the mining village Featherstone in the West Riding of Yorkshire. Two hundred unemployed coal miners were hired as extras. Players from Featherstone Rovers and Huddersfield were used in the rugby scenes.

Reception
Writing for The Spectator, Graham Greene described the film as "badly acted and carelessly directed", opining that even an actor like Howard could "do very little with the [film's] stale gags" and that the portrayal of Alf Scodger was one of "devastating pathos".

External links
 Hope of his side on the Internet Movie Database

References

1935 films
British sports comedy films
Films directed by Jack Raymond
Rugby league films
Films set in England
British black-and-white films
British and Dominions Studios films
Films shot at Imperial Studios, Elstree
1930s sports comedy films
1935 comedy films
1930s English-language films
1930s British films